Calopus is a genus of false blister beetles in the family Oedemeridae. There is at least one described species in Calopus, C. angustus.

References

Further reading

 
 

Oedemeridae
Articles created by Qbugbot